Chinchaga Airport  was an airport located near to Chinchaga, Alberta, Canada.

References

External links
Place to Fly on COPA's Places to Fly airport directory

Defunct airports in Alberta
Clear Hills County